The ExoMars Trace Gas Orbiter (TGO or ExoMars Orbiter) is a collaborative project between the European Space Agency (ESA) and the Russian Roscosmos agency that sent an atmospheric research orbiter and the Schiaparelli demonstration lander to Mars in 2016 as part of the European-led ExoMars programme.

The Trace Gas Orbiter delivered the Schiaparelli lander on 16 October 2016, which crashed on the surface due to a premature release of the parachute.

A key goal is to gain a better understanding of methane and other trace gases present in the Martian atmosphere that could be evidence for possible biological activity. The programme will follow with the Kazachok lander and the Rosalind Franklin rover in 2022, which will search for biomolecules and biosignatures; the TGO will operate as the communication link for the ExoMars lander and rover and provide communication for other Mars surface probes with Earth.

History 
Investigations with space and Earth-based observatories have demonstrated the presence of a small amount of methane on the atmosphere of Mars that seems to vary with location and time. This may indicate the presence of microbial life on Mars, or a geochemical process such as volcanism or hydrothermal activity.

The challenge to discern the source of methane in the atmosphere of Mars prompted the independent planning by ESA and NASA of one orbiter each that would carry instruments in order to determine if its formation is of biological or geological origin, as well as its decomposition products such as formaldehyde and methanol.

Origins 
ExoMars Trace Gas Orbiter was born out of the nexus of ESA's Aurora programme ExoMars flagship and NASA's 2013 and 2016 Mars Science Orbiter (MSO) concepts. It became a flexible collaborative proposal within NASA and ESA to send a new orbiter-carrier to Mars in 2016 as part of the European-led ExoMars mission. On the ExoMars side, ESA authorised about half a billion Euros in 2005 for a rover and mini-station; eventually this evolved into being delivered by an orbiter rather than a cruise stage.

Attempted collaboration with NASA 
NASA's Mars Science Orbiter (MSO) was originally envisioned in 2008 as an all-NASA endeavour aiming for a late 2013 launch. NASA and ESA officials agreed to pool resources and technical expertise and collaborate to launch only one orbiter. The agreement, called the Mars Exploration Joint Initiative, was signed in July 2009 and proposed to use an Atlas rocket launcher instead of a Soyuz rocket, which significantly altered the technical and financial setting of the European ExoMars mission. Since the rover was originally planned to be launched along with the TGO, a prospective agreement would require that the rover lose enough weight to fit aboard the Atlas launch vehicle with NASA's orbiter. Instead of reducing the rover's mass, it was nearly doubled when the mission was combined with other projects to a multi-spacecraft programme divided over two Atlas V launches: the ExoMars Trace Gas Orbiter (TGO) was merged into the project, carrying a meteorological lander planned for launch in 2016. The European orbiter would carry several instruments originally meant for NASA's MSO, so NASA scaled down the objectives and focused on atmospheric trace gases detection instruments for their incorporation in ESA's ExoMars Trace Gas Orbiter.

Under the FY2013 budget President Barack Obama released on 13 February 2012, NASA terminated its participation in ExoMars due to budgetary cuts in order to pay for the cost overruns of the James Webb Space Telescope. With NASA's funding for this project cancelled, most of ExoMars' plans had to be restructured.

Collaboration with Russia 
On 15 March 2012, the ESA's ruling council announced it would press ahead with its ExoMars program in partnership with the Russian space agency Roscosmos, which planned to contribute two heavy-lift Proton launch vehicles and an additional entry, descent and landing system to the 2020 rover mission.

Under the collaboration proposal with Roscosmos, the ExoMars mission was split into two parts: the orbiter/lander mission in March 2016 that includes the TGO and a  diameter stationary lander built by ESA named Schiaparelli, and the Rosalind Franklin rover mission in 2020 (postponed to 2022 ). Both missions are using a Proton-M rocket.

Launch 

The Trace Gas Orbiter and descent module Schiaparelli completed testing and were integrated to a Proton rocket at the Baikonur Cosmodrome in Kazakhstan in mid-January 2016. The launch occurred at 09:31 UTC on 14 March 2016. Four rocket burns occurred in the following 10 hours before the descent module and orbiter were released. A signal from the spacecraft was received at 21:29 UTC that day, confirming that the launch was successful and the spacecraft were functioning properly.

Shortly after separation from the probes, a Brazilian ground telescope recorded small objects in the vicinity of the Briz-M upper booster stage, suggesting that the Briz-M stage exploded a few kilometres away, without damaging the orbiter or lander. Briefing reporters in Moscow, the head of Roscosmos denied any anomaly and made all launch data available for inspection.

Status 

Specifications 

Dimensions  The central bus is 
Propulsion   bi-propellant main engine, used for Mars orbit insertion and manoeuvres
Power   solar arrays spanning  tip-to-tip, and capable of rotating in one axis; generates about 2,000 W of power at Mars
Batteries  2 modules of lithium-ion batteries with approximately 5100 watt hours total capacity to provide power during eclipses over the prime mission
Communication   X band high-gain antenna with a two-axis pointing mechanism and 65 W RF travelling-wave tube amplifier to communicate with Earth
 Two Electra UHF band transceivers with a single helical antenna to communicate with spacecraft at Mars
Thermal control  Spacecraft yaw axis control to ensure the three faces containing the science payload remain cold
Mass  , wet mass of the orbiter
 , wet mass of the orbiter plus Schiaparelli lander
Payload   of science instruments

Science 

The TGO separated from the ExoMars Schiaparelli demonstration lander and would have provided it with telecommunication relay for 8 Martian solar days (sols) after landing. Then the TGO gradually underwent aerobraking for seven months into a more circular orbit for science observations and will provide communications relay for the Rosalind Franklin rover to be launched in 2022, and will continue serving as a relay satellite for future landed missions.

The FREND instrument is currently mapping hydrogen levels to a maximum depth of  beneath the Martian surface. Locations where hydrogen is found may indicate water-ice deposits, which could be useful for future crewed missions.

Particularly, the mission is in the process of characterising spatial, temporal variation, and localisation of sources for a broad list of atmospheric trace gases. If methane is found in the presence of propane or ethane, that would be a strong indication that biological processes are involved. However, if methane is found in the presence of gases such as sulfur dioxide, that would be an indication that the methane is a byproduct of geological processes.

Detection

The nature of the methane source requires measurements of a suite of trace gases in order to characterise potential biochemical and geochemical processes at work. The orbiter has very high sensitivity to (at least) the following molecules and their isotopomers:
water, hydroperoxyl, nitrogen dioxide, nitrous oxide, methane, acetylene, ethylene, ethane, formaldehyde, hydrogen cyanide, hydrogen sulfide, carbonyl sulfide, sulfur dioxide, hydrogen chloride, carbon monoxide and ozone. Detection sensitivities are at levels of 100 parts per trillion, improved to 10 parts per trillion or better by averaging spectra which could be taken at several spectra per second.
Characterisation
Spatial and temporal variability: latitude–longitude coverage multiple times in a Mars year to determine regional sources and seasonal variations (reported to be large, but still controversial with present understanding of Mars gas-phase photochemistry)
Correlation of concentration observations with environmental parameters of temperature, dust and ice aerosols (potential sites for heterogeneous chemistry)
Localisation
Mapping of multiple tracers (e.g., aerosols, water vapour, CO) with different photochemical lifetimes and correlations helps constrain model simulations and points to source/sink regions
To achieve the spatial resolution required to localise sources might require tracing molecules at parts-per-billion concentrations

Instruments 

Like the Mars Reconnaissance Orbiter, the Trace Gas Orbiter is a hybrid science and telecom orbiter.

 The Nadir and Occultation for Mars Discovery (NOMAD) has two infrared and one ultraviolet spectrometer channels.  Developed by Belgium.
 The Atmospheric Chemistry Suite (ACS) has three infrared spectrometer channels. Developed by Russia.

NOMAD and ACS are providing the most extensive spectral coverage of Martian atmospheric processes so far. Twice per orbit, at local sunrise and sunset, they are able to observe the Sun as it shines through the atmosphere. Detection of atmospheric trace species at the parts-per-billion (ppb) level are possible.

The Colour and Stereo Surface Imaging System (CaSSIS) is a high-resolution, colour stereo camera for building accurate digital elevation models of the Martian surface. It will also be an important tool for characterising candidate landing site locations for future missions. Developed by Switzerland.
The Fine-Resolution Epithermal Neutron Detector (FREND) is a neutron detector that can provide information on the presence of hydrogen, in the form of water or hydrated minerals, in the top  of the Martian surface. Developed by Russia.

Relay telecommunications 

Due to the challenges of entry, descent and landing, Mars landers are highly constrained in mass, volume and power. For landed missions, this places severe constraints on antenna size and transmission power, which in turn greatly reduce direct-to-Earth communication capability in comparison to orbital spacecraft. As an example, the capability downlinks on Spirit and Opportunity rovers had only  the capability of the Mars Reconnaissance Orbiter downlink. Relay communication addresses this problem by allowing Mars surface spacecraft to communicate using higher data rates over short-range links to nearby Mars orbiters, while the orbiter takes on the task of communicating over the long-distance link back to Earth. This relay strategy offers a variety of key benefits to Mars landers: increased data return volume, reduced energy requirements, reduced communications system mass, increased communications opportunities, robust critical event communications and in situ navigation aid. NASA provided an Electra telecommunications relay and navigation instrument to assure communications between probes and rovers on the surface of Mars and controllers on Earth. The TGO will provide the 2022 Rosalind Franklin rover with telecommunications relay; it will also serve as a relay satellite for future landed missions.

Results

The spacecraft took its first photos of the surface of Mars on 15 April 2018. The first year of science operations yielded a wealth of new data and scientific discoveries, including: new observations of the atmospheric composition and structure, water-ice cloud enhancement during a global dust storm, new measurements of the atmospheric thermal structure and density, estimations of the timespan of the climate record of the south polar ice sheet, confirmation of dry-processes being responsible for Recurring Slope Lineae in Gale crater, and high-resolution maps of shallow subsurface Hydrogen, increasing the known amounts of probably near-surface buried water ice.

In April 2019, the science team reported their first methane results: TGO had detected no methane whatsoever, even though their data were more sensitive than the methane concentrations found using Curiosity, Mars Express, and ground-based observations.

See also

References

External links 
 ExoMars Trace Gas Orbiter at ESA.int
 ESA ExoMars on Flickr

ExoMars
European Space Agency space probes
Russian space probes
Satellites orbiting Mars
Attached spacecraft
Space probes launched in 2016
Roscosmos